Wadsworth is a civil parish in the Metropolitan Borough of Calderdale in West Yorkshire, England.  It has a population of 1,456, increasing to 1,603 at the 2011 Census, and was, until 1974, part of Hepton Rural District.

Historically part of the West Riding of Yorkshire, the main settlements in the parish are Old Town, Chiserley and Pecket Well. It was named a berewick of Wakefield in Domesday Book, and thus subsequently recorded as a subinfeudatory manor, before its subsequent extinguishment in the nineteenth century. From the seventeenth century it was also one of five townships forming the chapelry of Heptonstall.

References

Civil parishes in West Yorkshire
Geography of Calderdale